Sadiq is a male name. The most prominent bearer of the name is Ja'far al-Sadiq, the 8th-century Muslim scholar and scientist, considered as an Imam and founder of the Ja'fari school of jurisprudence by Twelver and Isma'ili Shi’as, and a major figure in the Hanafi and Maliki schools of Sunni jurisprudence, known at times simply as Sadiq (The Truthful).

Sadiq is also an Arabic / Islamic common given name and surname.

Mononym
Sadiq (Indian actor), or Mohammed Sadiq, an Indian actor in Malayalam movies
Mir Sadiq or Gudu Khan, politician who held the post of a minister in the cabinet of Tipu Sultan of Mysore in the late 18th century

Titular
Muhammad III as-Sadiq or 'As-Sadiq' (Arabic: الصادق) meaning 'the righteous') (1813–1882), the Husainid Bey of Tunis from 1859 until 1882

Given name
Sadiq-ur-Rashid Ibrahim Abbasi (1926 or 1928–2002), Pakistani general, Governor of Sindh
Sadiq Abdullahi (born 1960), Nigerian tennis player
Sadiq Abdulkarim Abdulrahman, Libyan politician and physician who served as first deputy prime minister 
Sadiq Adebiyi (born 1997), Nigerian rugby league footballer
Sadiq Ahangaran, Iranian Zaker (Karbala/Ahlul-Bayt tragedies reciter)
Sadiq al-Ahmar (born 1956), Yemeni politician and the leader of the Hashid tribal federation
Sadiq Ali (1952–2011), Indian politician from Kashmir, poet, writer and environmentalist activist
Sadiq Al-Ghariani, Grand Mufti of Libya 
Sadiq Jalal Al-Azm (1934–2016), Syrian professor of Modern European Philosophy
Sadiq Batcha (c. 1972–2011), Indian entrepreneur 
Sadiq Daba, Nigerian actor and former broadcaster
Sadiq Fakir (born 1967), Pakistani singer of Sindhi music
Sadiq Farhad, Afghani cricketer
Sadiq El Fitouri (born 1994), Libyan professional footballer
Sadiq Jaber (born 1960), Iraqi footballer 
Sadiq Khan, British politician, mayor of London 
Sadiq-ur-Rahman Kidwai, Indian writer, academician 
Sadiq Kirmani (born 1989), Indian cricketer
Sadiq al-Mahdi, also known as Sadiq as-Siddiq (born 1935), Sudanese political and religious figure, Prime Minister of Sudan from 1966 to 1967 and again from 1986 to 1989
Sadiq Ali Memon, Pakistani politician, member of the National Assembly of Pakistan
Sadiq Mohammad, Pakistani cricketer
Sadiq Muhammad Khan or Sir Sadiq Muhammad Khan V Abbasi (1904–1966), the Nawab, and later Amir, of Bahawalpur State from 1907 to 1966.
Sadiq Al-Mohsin (born 1997), Saudi Arabian handball player 
Sadiq Mousa (born 1959), Iraqi footballer
Sadiq Nawaz, fictional character from Ackley Bridge
Sadiq Hussain Qureshi (1927–2000), Pakistani politician, Governor and Chief Minister of Punjab in the 1970s
Sadiq Saadoun, Iraqi footballer
Sadıq Sadıqov (born 1965), Azerbaijani sports administrator, President of the Neftchi Baku PFK 
Sadiq Sanjrani (born 1978), Pakistani politician from Balochistan and Chairman of the Senate of Pakistan
Sadiq Hussaini Shirazi (born 1942), an Iranian Twelver Shia Marja'
Sadiq Sillah (born 1969), Sierra Leonean politician
Syed Saddiq Syed Abdul Rahman (born 1992), Malaysian politician

Middle name
Abubakar Sadiq A. Mohammed, Nigerian politician and government minister
Ghulam Sadiq Khan (1939–2016), Indian classical vocalist
Jam Sadiq Ali (ca. 1934–1992), Pakistani politician from Sindh
Muhammad Sadiq Ardestani (died 1721), an Iranian Shia philosophers during Safavid period
Suleiman Sadiq Umar (born 1971), Nigerian politician and Senator
Tahir Sadiq Khan, Pakistani politician, member of the National Assembly of Pakistan
Muhammad Saddiq Al-Minshawi Egyptian rectiter of the Quran

Surname
Agha Sadiq (1909–1977), Pakistani writer and poet
Ahmed Sadiq (born 1979), Nigerian boxer
Ayaz Sadiq (born 1954), Pakistani politician, member of the National Assembly of Pakistan
Ghazi al-Sadiq (died 2012), Sudanese politician and government minister
Ghulam Mohammed Sadiq (1912–1971), Indian politician, Prime Minister of Jammu and Kashmir from 1964 to 1965
Hana Sadiq, Iraqi fashion designer
Ibrahim Sadiq (born 2000), Ghanaian footballer
Kalbe Sadiq, or Moulana Dr. Kalbe Sadiq, Islamic scholar, thinker, reformer, educationist and preacher
Karim Sadiq (born 1984), Afghan cricketer
Mirwais Sadiq (1973–2004), Afghani politician and government minister 
Mohammed Sadiq (disambiguation), many people with the surname 
Muhammad Sadiq (disambiguation), many people with the surname
Munir Sadiq (born 1955), Pakistani sportsman and medalist in sailing
Nauman Sadiq (born 1979), Pakistani cricketer
Nuzhat Sadiq, Pakistani politician, member of the Senate of Pakistan
Rashidat Sadiq (born 1981), Nigerian women's basketball player
S M Sadiq, or Sheikh Muhammad Sadiq, Pakistani lyricist and poet
Saba Sadiq (born 1966), Pakistani politician, member of the Provincial Assembly of the Punjab
Sadiq Sani Sadiq (born 1981), Nigerian film actor
Shagufta Sadiq, Pakistani politician, member of the National Assembly of Pakistan
Shazia Sadiq, Australian computer scientist
Umar Sadiq (born 1997), Nigerian footballer
Yousif Muhammed Sadiq (born 1978), Iraqi Kurdish politician
Zahid Sadiq (born 1965), Kenyan cricketer

See also
Sadykhov/Sadykov
Sadek (disambiguation)
Sadeq (disambiguation)
Sadegh (disambiguation)
Siddiq (name)
Siddique (disambiguation)
Sadiq Abad (disambiguation)
Al-Sadiq Mosque or Wabash Mosque, a mosque in the Bronzeville neighborhood in city of Chicago funded with the money predominantly donated by African-American Ahmadi Muslim converts
Sadiq Public School (SPS), a Pakistani college-preparatory boarding school located in Bahawalpur, Punjab, Pakistan

References